Lojinx is a British independent record label and music publishing company established in 2004 in South London, UK.  It was voted as one of the top ten "Best Record Labels of 2010". Based in London, Lojinx markets and distributes physical and digital music products globally via The Orchard.

Discography

Artists

References

External links
 Lojinx website
 Lojinx YouTube
 Lojinx Google+

British independent record labels
Record labels established in 2004
Alternative rock record labels
Indie rock record labels
Pop record labels
Music publishing companies of the United Kingdom